Hafize Hajdini is a Kosovo-Albanian former deputy.

Born on October 1, 1972, Hajdini was a member of the Assembly of Kosovo from the SLS Parliamentary Group in the period of Kosovo's declaration of Independence, on February 17, 2008. Hajdini graduated from the High School in Ferizaj in Economics. Hajdini was the Director of the NGO Center, SHG. A.K “Edona”.

References 

Biography/Politics and government articles needing expert attention
Politicians from Pristina
Kosovo Albanians
1972 births
Living people